The discography of Italian pop singer-songwriter Tiziano Ferro consists of eight studio albums, a greatest hits album, one video album, thirty-one singles as lead singer, twelve singles as a featured artist and a box set.

Albums

Studio albums

Compilation albums

Video albums

Box sets

Singles

Featured singles

Other charted songs

Other appearances

Music videos

Buona(cattiva)sorte  Gaetano Morbioli
Accetto Miracoli     Gaetano Morbioli

Writing credits

References 

Discography
Discographies of Italian artists
Pop music discographies
Latin pop music discographies